The Vitiaz-class ships were a pair of partially protected cruisers built for the Imperial Russian Navy in the mid-1880s.

Footnotes

References

 
Cruisers of the Imperial Russian Navy